Chandler Thornton is an American political operative who served from 2017-2021 as Chairman of the College Republican National Committee, the college wing of the Republican Party.

Education 
Chandler attended American University, earning his Bachelor of Arts in Political Science and his Master of Public Administration. He is a graduate of the Campaign Management Institute in Washington, D.C. and the European Public Affairs and Advocacy Institute in Brussels, Belgium. He was a George C. Marshall Fellow at The Heritage Foundation.

Career 

Thornton started his career as a communications intern with the Maryland Republican Party in 2010 and shortly thereafter interned with the Bob Ehrlich campaign for Governor of Maryland. In 2011, he interned for Congressman Roscoe Bartlett and served as a Page in the Maryland General Assembly. From 2011-2012 he was a Political/Coalitions intern with the Mitt Romney 2012 presidential campaign and then served as director of the Kennedy Political Union Lecture Series until 2014. In 2014 he served as Chairman of the D.C. Federation of College Republicans. He also interned with Hudson Institute, The Heritage Foundation, and the United States Department of the Treasury from 2014-2016. In 2016 he served two terms as Northeast Regional Vice Chairman of the College Republicans.

In 2017, he was elected at the College Republican National Convention to chairman. Thornton's tenure as CRNC Chairman ended in 2021. Notably, during his last months in office, some College Republicans, including Ty Seymour who served as National Treasurer under Thornton, made accusations of corruption and meddling in the election of his successor. Thornton maintains these accusations are false.

He was featured on the 2016 Red Alert Politics “30 Under 30” list of young conservatives, the 2017 Maverick PAC “Future 40” list of young professionals, and the 2018 Newsmax “30 under 30” list of most influential Republicans.

Controversy 

In 2021, many State Federations considered secession from the College Republican National Committee (CRNC). College Republicans alleged that Thornton had unfairly influenced the voting process in the 2021 national executive committee elections to eliminate delegates who had pledged their support for Judah Waxelbaum, the opponent of Thornton's preferred candidate Courtney Britt.

Some states supporting Britt sent the final documentation that was required for credentialing by email July 11, 2021, all with the same or similar subject lines and body text, and all states supporting Waxelbaum failed to submit this required documentation.  It was later discovered that Thornton directly contacted a chapter whose state supported Britt to ensure they were in compliance. Email correspondence between Thornton and Case Western University Professor Jonathan Adler showed that Thornton had taken an active role in ensuring that this chapter whose state pledged support to Britt would be in compliance with the rules. Following the appeals process, the arbitrator granted delegates to all the states supporting Britt who had appealed based on the fact that they had this necessary documentation, but denied almost all the states supporting Waxelbaum because they lacked it. Waxelbaum objected to the results of credentialing stating, "Currently, 20 percent of the CRNC cannot vote, that’s not even including the states that didn’t get votes and didn’t appeal for votes. Of the states that endorsed me, they removed twelve of them, taking me from 30 states to 18."

Prior to the convention, a couple Republican leaders spoke out against the lack of representation for some states at the 2021 Biennial Convention.

References 

Year of birth missing (living people)
Living people
American University School of Public Affairs alumni
College Republican National Committee chairs
Maryland Republicans